Bindu Ghosh is a movie and stage actress and choreographer who has performed in Tamil and south Indian Languages. Her debut film was Kozhi Koovuthu released in 1982.

As choreographer 
Bindu Ghosh's birth name is Vimala. "Kalathur Kannamma" is her first film. In that film, she has performed a group dance along with Kamal Haasan. She dances to the group song "Ellorum Nalam Vaazha" She has been featured in Group Dance in all the films of Thangappan Master since then.

As actress 

Initially, she acted in dramas before acting in comedies. She has acted with actors Rajinikanth, Kamal Haasan, Sivaji Ganesan, Mohan, Prabhu, Vijayakanth, Karthik.

Her movies include Kozhi Koovuthu, Uruvangal Maralam, Dowry Kalyanam, Thoongathey Thambi Thoongathey, Soorakottai Singakutti, Osai, Komberi Mookkan, Needhiyin Nizhal, and Navagraha Nayagi.

Now 
She was diagnosed with various health conditions which made it difficult for her to continue her acting career. She lives with her two sons who are also choreographers in Tamil cinema and Telugu cinema

Filmography

References

External links 
 

Actresses in Tamil cinema
Indian film actresses
Tamil comedians
Indian women comedians
Living people
Year of birth missing (living people)